Six & Out is an Australian rock band. The name is derived from the backyard cricket rule of Six and Out, which specifies that if a player hits a six that causes the ball to be lost, the player is automatically dismissed from further batting. 

One of their more prominent songs is "Can't Bowl, Can't Throw", which was released as a single and reached number 100 on the ARIA singles chart, and whose title refers to the infamous cricket incident involving Shane Warne, Scott Muller and "Cameraman Joe" during the Second Test between Australia and Pakistan at Bellerive Oval in Hobart in 1999.

All members of Six & Out are former New South Wales first-class cricketers.

Members 
Richard Chee Quee – lead vocals
Brett Lee – bass guitar, vocals
Shane Lee – guitar, vocals
Brad McNamara – guitar, vocals
Gavin Robertson – drums, vocals

Discography

Albums

Singles

References 

Cricket culture
Australian rock music groups
New South Wales musical groups